The Corsican Nationalist Alliance is a political party endorsing Corsican nationalism.  It is headed by Pierre Poggioli.

See also
Corsica Nazione

Official Site
http://www.anc-corsica.com/

Corsican nationalism
Nationalist parties in France
Political parties in Corsica
Political parties established in 1989
1989 establishments in France